Robert Curzon (c. 1491–1550) was the member of Parliament for Cricklade in the parliament of 1529.

Early life
Robert Curzon was born by 1491, the second son of Sir Robert Curzon of Beckhall, Billingford, Norfolk by his second wife. He was educated at Lincoln's Inn and called to the bar in 1518.

Career
Curzon was the member of Parliament for Cricklade in the Parliament of 1529.

References 

Members of the Parliament of England (pre-1707) for Cricklade
English MPs 1529–1536
Year of birth uncertain
1550 deaths
Members of Parliament for Calne
1490s births
People from Billingford, Breckland
English barristers